Warakagoda Gnanarathana Thero (born 18 March 1942) is a Sri Lankan Buddhist monk who is the present Mahanayaka Thero of the Asgiriya chapter of Siam Nikaya. He was appointed as the 22nd Mahanayake Thera of the Asgiriya Chapter on 7 April 2016, by the Karaka Sangha Sabha of Asgiriya chapter, after the demise of Most Ven. Galagama Sri Aththadassi Mahanayaka Thera.

Gnanarathana thero is known for voicing his right-wing political proclivities in public. In 2017, he issued a statement condoning the views of the hard-line nationalist monk Galagoda Aththe Gnanasara. At a public event in 2019, Gnanarathana thero endorsed the views of those who called for the stoning of a Muslim doctor accused of sterilization of Sinhala women as well as the boycotting of Muslim businesses, stating that Muslims are sterilizing Sinhalese through food sold in their shops. At the same event, he endorsed the purported presidential candidacy of Chamal Rajapaksa. The ensuing public backlash forced Gnanarathana thero to deny his previous statements.

See also
 Siyam Nikaya
 Diyawadana Nilame of Sri Dalada Maligawa, Kandy
 The Venerable Chancellor | Buddhist and Pali University of Sri Lanka, Homagama

References

 

1942 births
Living people
Theravada Buddhist monks
Sri Lankan Buddhist monks
Sri Lankan Theravada Buddhists
Sinhalese monks
20th-century Buddhist monks
21st-century Buddhist monks